Basic helix-loop-helix transcription factor scleraxis is a protein that in humans is encoded by the SCXB gene.

References